The genus Artanema is a small group of flowering plant species in the Linderniaceae. It was formerly included in the Plantaginaceae, but reclassified based on genetic evidence.

Species
 Artanema bantamense Backer
 Artanema evrardii (Bonati) T.Yamaz.
 Artanema fimbriatum (W.J. Hook. ex R. Graham) D. Don
 Artanema finetianum (Bonati) T.Yamaz.
 Artanema longifolium (L.) Vatke

External links

 W3Tropicos

Linderniaceae
Lamiales genera